Ichime Glacier is a glacier flowing to the sea just west of Kasumi Rock in Queen Maud Land, Antarctica. It was mapped from surveys and air photos by members of the Japanese Antarctic Research Expedition, 1957–1962, who also gave the glacier its name.

See also
 List of glaciers in the Antarctic
 Glaciology

References

 

Glaciers of Queen Maud Land
Prince Olav Coast